This is a list of the largest Canada-based law firms by revenue in 2017.

Gowling reported that its Canadian partnership, with 407 partners and about 650 lawyers, generated 59% of the combined firm's revenue (equalling about US$ 346.41 million).

See also
List of largest law firms by revenue
List of largest United States-based law firms by profits per partner
List of largest United Kingdom-based law firms by revenue
List of largest Europe-based law firms by revenue
List of largest Japan-based law firms by head count
List of largest China-based law firms by revenue

References 

Lists of law firms
Firms